Phoon Kok Kwang is a Singaporean civil engineer, currently a Distinguished Professor and Vice Provost, and formerly Provost's Chair Professor, at National University of Singapore and is the founding editor-in-chief of the Taylor & Francis journal Georisk. He is also a Fellow of the American Society of Civil Engineers. He was also previously the Kwang-Hua Professor at Tongji University.

In 2017, Phoon received the Humboldt Prize.

References

Year of birth missing (living people)
Living people
Academic staff of the National University of Singapore
Singaporean engineers
Cornell University alumni